Hans Jørgen Lysglimt Johansen (born September 13, 1971) is a Norwegian economist and political activist who is the leader of the party Alliance - Alternative for Norway. He is known for his neo-Nazi rhetoric, with regular racist and antisemitic statements.

Johansen became known in the Norwegian mass media as a supporter of the Republican candidate Donald Trump during the US presidential election campaign in 2016.

He has since received attention for numerous statements that have been described as racist, including Holocaust denial and attacks on Jews, which has been monitored by the police. He has otherwise stated his support for the manifesto of 2011 Norway attacks terrorist Anders Behring Breivik, describing the attacks as "karma" for the Labour Party, also supporting Apartheid in South Africa, the stab-in-the-back myth and the idea of the Aryan race. He maintains friendly relations with the Nordic Resistance Movement and welcomes their members as candidates for his party.

Background
Johansen has a degree in economics from Lund University in Sweden, where he studied from 1990 to 1996. He then worked in the mining industry in the Philippines until 1997. From 2000 to 2003, Lysglimt Johansen was the leader of the FRI Democrats, a politically independent, liberal organization that became formed after the Bolkesjø process in the Progress Party in 1994.

References

1971 births
Living people
Norwegian politicians
Norwegian conspiracy theorists
Norwegian neo-Nazis